The Anglican Church of St. Mary and St. Peter in Winford, Somerset, England, dates from the 15th Century. It has been designated as a Grade II* listed building.

The main body of the original church was rebuilt in 1796 however the tower, which was built around 1437, survives.

The church consists of a nave, chancel and north and south aisles along with the four-stage west tower which is supported by set back buttresses and has a small polygonal stair turret from the roof. Around the tower is a trefoil-headed parapet with corner crocketted pinnacles and gargoyles on the corners. The tower has six bells. These were re-tuned in 2006.

The interior holds a font and wooden pulpit. There is some stained glass which is decorated with heraldic shields and a canvas coat of arms beneath the tower. An unidentified monument and a Shire Monument dating from around 1764 in the churchyard are also listed.

The parish is part of the benefice of Winford with Felton Common within the Diocese of Bath and Wells.

See also
 List of Somerset towers
 List of ecclesiastical parishes in the Diocese of Bath and Wells

References

15th-century church buildings in England
Buildings and structures completed in 1437
Towers completed in the 15th century
Church of England church buildings in North Somerset
Grade II* listed churches in Somerset
Grade II* listed buildings in North Somerset